Dessa Rose is a novel by Sherley Anne Williams published in 1986 by HarperCollins. The book is a neo-slave narrative, incorporating many elements of traditional slave narratives. The book is divided into three sections: "The Darky", "The Wench" and "The Negress". The sections represent a different stage of growth in the life of the protagonist, Dessa Rose.

Plot summary

The book begins with Dessa Rose, a pregnant slave fugitive in a prison cell in Marengo County, Alabama. Captured along with many of her fellow runaways, Dessa's execution was postponed until the birth of her child. Shortly before she gives birth, three men appear at night and rescue her. The four travel to a small plantation in Sutton managed by Ruth Elizabeth. Her husband had departed on a business trip several years ago and never returned. The slaves took off and Mrs. Rufel (as everyone calls her) began harboring runaway slaves to replace them.
The fugitives devise a plan to free themselves. Mrs. Rufel must sell the slaves during the day, then pick them back up at night, cheating the buyers out of their money. When the small band has accumulated enough money, the slaves will flee west.

Historical context

The book is based on two historical incidents. In 1829 a pregnant slave woman led a revolt against slave traders, and in 1830 a white woman had a habit of taking in runaway slaves. The book combines the two stories, with the two women meeting and participating in a plan to free the runaways.

The novel was written as a response to William Styron's The Confessions of Nat Turner. The white man assuming the voice of an African-American man enraged the black community. In Dessa Rose, Sherley Anne Williams, a black woman takes the voice of a white woman.

Film adaptation
Irwin Winkler was going to direct a film adaptation in 1988 starring Natasha Richardson, Angela Bassett, Donald Sutherland, Laurence Fishburne, and Cicely Tyson however the film was shut down by United Artists days before shooting with the studio writing off the $5 million cost.

Further reading
 Mary Kemp Davis, "Everybody Knows Her Name: The Recovery of the Past in Sherley Anne Williams's Dessa Rose", Callaloo 40.1 (1989), pp. 544–558.
 Anne E, Goldman, "'I Made the Ink': (Literary) Production and reproduction in Dessa Rose and Beloved", Feminist Studies 16.2 (Summer 1990), pp. 313–330.
 Marta E. Sanchez, "The Estrangement Effect in Sherley Anne Williams' Dessa Rose", Genders 15 (Winter 1992), pp. 21–36.

References

External links
 harpercollins.com

1986 books
Novels about American slavery